Megachile gigantea is a species of bee in the family Megachilidae. It was described by Friese in 1911.

References

Gigantea
Insects described in 1911